Flavobacterium degerlachei is a Gram-negative, rod-shaped and psychrophilic bacterium from the genus of Flavobacterium which has been isolated from microbial mat from the Lake Ace in the Antarctica.

References

 

degerlachei
Bacteria described in 2004